Komarna Vas (or Obertappelwerch) is a village on the eastern edge of Kočevski Rog in the Municipality of Semič in Slovenia. The area is part of the historical region of Lower Carniola. The municipality is now included in the Southeast Slovenia Statistical Region.

History 
Komarna Vas was inhabited by Gottschee Germans that were mostly expelled in 1941 during the Second World War. 
The local church was burned down in 1942. It was dedicated to the Virgin Mary, Queen of All Saints.

References

External links
Komarna Vas at Geopedia
Pre–World War II map of Komarna Vas with oeconyms and family names

Populated places in the Municipality of Semič